The Hong Kong Visual Arts Centre is located in Hong Kong Park, at 7A Kennedy Road above Central, Hong Kong Island, Hong Kong. It was opened by Leung Ding-Bong, then chairman of the Urban Council, on 28 April 1992.

The centre encourages local art creation. It was restructured from an early 20th-century building called Cassels Block, a former barracks for married British officers of Victoria Barracks. It currently provides an area and facilities for local artists and includes modern artefacts and sculptures.

The historic building is listed as a Grade I historic building.

Gallery

See also
List of buildings and structures in Hong Kong
Museums in Hong Kong
Victoria Barracks

References

External links

 

Arts centres in Hong Kong
Monuments and memorials in Hong Kong
Hong Kong Park
Central, Hong Kong